The Kansas City Open is a defunct men's tennis tournament that was played on the 1972 USLTA Indoor Circuit for one year in 1972. The event was held in Kansas City and was played indoors.  Tom Edlefsen won the singles event while Ilie Năstase and Ion Ţiriac teamed-up to win the doubles event.

Past finals

Singles

Doubles

External links
 ATP results archive

Defunct tennis tournaments in the United States
Tennis in Kansas
Hard court tennis tournaments in the United States
USLTA Indoor Circuit